Thaal Sinestro (or simply Sinestro) is a supervillain appearing in American comic books published by DC Comics, particularly those featuring Green Lantern. Sinestro is a former Green Lantern Corps member who was dishonorably discharged for abusing his power. He is the archnemesis of Hal Jordan and founder of the Sinestro Corps.

Sinestro has appeared in various forms of non-comics media including shows, films, and video games, and he made his live-action debut in the 2011 film Green Lantern, played by Mark Strong.

Publication history

The character was created by John Broome and Gil Kane, and first appeared in Green Lantern (vol. 2) #7 (August 1961).

In 2009, IGN ranked Sinestro as the 15th Greatest Comic Book Villain of All Time.

Fictional character biography

Green Lantern
Sinestro is born on the planet Korugar in space sector 1417. His dedication to preserving order originally manifests in his previous career, an anthropologist specializing in reconstructions of ruins of long-dead civilizations. One day, a Green Lantern named Prohl Gosgotha crash-lands near him, injured and apparently dying. Prohl gives his ring to Sinestro, who barely understands what to do with it. He uses it to defend himself from the Lantern's pursuer: a Weaponer of Qward. In the end, Sinestro has to destroy the ruins he was restoring to crush the Qwardian. Afterwards, Gosgotha turns out to still be alive and asks for his ring back to keep him alive long enough to get help. Knowing this would mean no longer being a Green Lantern, Sinestro lets him die and takes over his post. The Guardians are unaware of his actions.

In Green Lantern #45, his wife is shown for the first time in a flashback and revealed to be the sister of Abin Sur.

When Hal Jordan joins the Green Lantern Corps, Sinestro is assigned to be his instructor. Jordan is horrified at his new mentor's totalitarian methods, though Sinestro maintains that his iron-fisted rule is necessary to protect the people from alien forces. During his training, Jordan helps Sinestro repel an attempted invasion of Korugar by the alien warlords known as the Khunds. When Jordan calls for help from the other Green Lanterns, Sinestro's dictatorship is exposed and he is forced to appear before the Guardians for punishment. Katma Tui, the leader of a Korugarian resistance movement who feels that Sinestro's "protection" keeps her people from growing as a society through contact with other alien races, is recruited as his replacement in the Corps. Katma Tui eventually grows into one of the most respected Green Lanterns, but she and the rest of Korugar initially resists her appointment to the Corps. Due to Sinestro's actions, Korugar has come to consider the symbol of the Green Lantern Corps an emblem of terror and oppression.

Punishment and villainy

For using the power of the Green Lantern to instill fear rather than combat it, the Guardians banish Sinestro to the antimatter universe, a counterpart to the "real" universe made up of "negative matter". Sinestro ends up on the antimatter world of Qward, that universe's counterpart of the Guardians' homeworld Oa, which is ruled by the Weaponers of Qward, a race of warriors and scientists that bare a fierce hatred of the Guardians and all Green Lanterns. By exiling Sinestro to a world ruled by evil beings who specifically hate Green Lanterns, the Guardians hope to humble him. However, their attempt at punishment will be a major miscalculation. Sinestro believes himself to have been wronged by his former masters and now hates them just as much as the Weaponers do. Through their mutual hatred of the Guardians, Sinestro and the Weaponers become allies, with the Weaponers offering to help Sinestro gain his revenge.

Creating a yellow power ring for Sinestro to use, the Weaponers send him back to the "positive matter" universe to seek revenge. Sinestro quickly becomes the Green Lantern Corps' most powerful nemesis, partially due to a weakness in their power rings that prevent them from directly affecting the color yellow. Despite this, skilled Green Lanterns like Jordan, Sinestro's most hated enemy, always find ways to defeat him.

Pre-Crisis
Sinestro first meets Hal after already making an alliance with Qward. Hal had already beaten the Weaponers three times. Sinestro tries to kidnap him using a device which can transport people to Qward and is able to imprison him in a yellow bubble by threatening to kill 100,000 people. Hal uses his ring to speed up a clock, making Sinestro think his ring ran out of power. After releasing Hal from the bubble to eliminate him, Sinestro is defeated and imprisoned in a green bubble by Hal, who does not take him back to his universe as it would go against the jurisdiction of the Guardians. Using a ring that can drain the Green Lantern's ring-power, Sinestro escapes and continues to menace Hal. He tries to attack the Guardians after trapping Hal, before disguising himself as Hal so he can occupy a meeting of Green Lanterns and absorb power from their rings by casting an illusion of a monster so that they would use their rings. However, Jordan escapes and defeats Sinestro on Oa, who is placed in a green energy container which orbits the Universe by the power of many Green Lanterns. He escapes with a power ring hidden in his boot.

Post-Crisis
Before the Guardians take a leave of absence from their universe to attempt mating with their female counterparts, the Zamarons, they construct an inescapable prison for Sinestro and thousands of others on Oa. Sinestro manages to free himself through the mental manipulation of the Mad God of Sector 3600. Wielding nearly unlimited power, Sinestro murders entire star systems until he is finally subdued by the Green Lantern Corps of Earth. Guilty of multiple acts of genocide, Sinestro is put on trial again by the assembled membership of the Green Lantern Corps. Finding him guilty, they condemn him to death and execute him. Sinestro manages to cheat death by sending his essence into the Central Power Battery and shutting it down. While in the Battery, he also makes a startling discovery about the ancient weakness to yellow within the Green Lanterns' light.

Hal Jordan enters the Battery in a desperate attempt to restore the powers of his fellow Lanterns and ultimately defeats Sinestro, whose spirit is condemned to remain trapped inside the Central Battery, powerless, for eternity. Yet Sinestro earns an even greater personal victory as the so-called "yellow impurity" turns out to be a sentient entity known as Parallax, the living embodiment of fear. He also discovers the battery's power source is Parallax's green counterpart, Ion, the embodiment of willpower. Thanks to Sinestro's actions, Parallax successfully infects Jordan's mind, leaving the so-called "greatest Green Lantern" vulnerable to fear for the first time in his life and setting up Sinestro's ultimate triumph.

Guy Gardner
Sinestro's original yellow ring is stolen by Guy Gardner from Oa's Crypt of the Green Lantern Corps. During the encounter, Sinestro possesses John Stewart to confront Guy, but his spirit is not strong enough to defeat Gardner's willpower.

As the yellow ring only "speaks" Sinestro's native language, Guy was unable to communicate with it, which seems to understand him to a degree.

Guy only wears the yellow ring for a short time before Hal Jordan, possessed by Parallax, destroys it.

Parallax

In the meantime, the return of the Guardians result in the Corps being re-established. The newly restored Corps is short-lived, thanks to the inadvertent efforts of the alien warlord Mongul and Hank Henshaw, a cyborg who is at the time impersonating Superman. As part of their ultimately thwarted plot to transform Earth into a new version of Mongul's interstellar fortress Warworld and gain revenge on Superman, Mongul and the Cyborg use several nuclear devices to destroy Coast City, California, which is Hal Jordan's home, and everyone living in it. Driven mad with grief by the destruction of his city and the Guardians' apathy towards his plight, Jordan's previously indomitable willpower is shattered. Parallax is thus able to possess him completely and push him towards a homicidal rampage that wipes out most of the Guardians and leaves scores of Green Lanterns dead or maimed, as Parallax seeks to absorb the Central Power Battery's energies into his being.

As a last-ditch effort to halt Jordan's rampage, the Guardians free Sinestro from the Central Power Battery and send him to stop Jordan. After a battle, Jordan snaps Sinestro's neck, apparently killing him. It is later revealed that what the Guardians actually extracted from the Battery was a hard-light construct of Sinestro, created by Parallax and mentally puppeteered by the real Sinestro from within the Battery. Parallax then bonds to Jordan, who takes the entity's name for himself, and promptly finishes off the Green Lantern Corps by absorbing the Central Battery's energies into himself. With the Battery destroyed, Sinestro escapes and goes into hiding as he watches Jordan become what he always hated Sinestro for being: a traitor and a murderer reviled by his friends and his allies. When the last surviving Guardian, Ganthet, gives the last remaining power ring to Kyle Rayner, Sinestro becomes obsessed with the young Earthman, realizing that despite Jordan's downfall, his plot to extinguish the Green Lanterns' light failed.

Duplicate and time travel
During the period when he is believed to be dead, Sinestro has two indirect encounters with other heroes. Wonder Woman faces a duplicate of Sinestro created by an artificial intelligence based on the dead son of its creator. The A.I. created the duplicate Sinestro after watching videos of his old battles, believing that he is just playing a computer game, and unaware of the real-world damage that he is causing. Although he lacks Sinestro's tactical genius, the unrestrained use of his power destroys a bridge and a building, nearly suffocating Wonder Woman before he is defeated by the hero Champion (really a disguised Hercules).

On another occasion, Kyle Rayner is accidentally sent approximately a decade into the past, where he witnesses a battle between Hal and Sinestro. Although he initially distracts Hal at a crucial moment, Kyle's ring's immunity to yellow proves vital in preventing Sinestro from executing the Guardians of the Universe. Kyle and Hal subsequently sabotage his attempt to crash a planetoid into Oa by switching rings. Hal allows Sinestro to throw him away before using Kyle's ring to destroy the villain's equipment. Kyle keeps Sinestro occupied, using Hal's ring to protect him from mortal injury. However, after Sinestro's actions result in Hal unintentionally traveling to Kyle's future, this encounter is apparently erased from history when Hal, Kyle, and a Parallax-possessed older Hal Jordan (who detected his younger self's displacement and intervenes to try and send him home) work together to send Hal and Parallax back to their proper place in time to ensure that a Hal Jordan is present with powers to defeat the Sun-Eater, Hal returning to his own time just before Kyle's arrival changes history and defeating Sinestro on his own.

Later, Hal Jordan's Spectre also clashes with the ghost of Sinestro, who traps him in a dream where he never becomes a Green Lantern. Upon his defeat, Sinestro is given the chance to choose his fate. He chooses Hell, and is dragged into the Underworld. In retrospect, it is assumed that this version of Sinestro is another hard light construct created by Parallax at Sinestro's behest, as the fear entity is still bonded to Jordan's soul during his time as the Spectre, continuously breaking his will.

Return
Sinestro eventually reveals the charade of his 'death' when Kyle Rayner discovers the existence of Parallax and reveals it to Green Arrow and the Justice League. Nearly killing the two heroes, Sinestro is stopped by the newly resurrected Hal Jordan, who reclaims his ring and is purged of Parallax's influence. The two fight to a draw, with Sinestro escaping to the antimatter universe when his ring is damaged by Hal.

Sinestro later appears in the mini-series Villains United, in which he captures Lady Quark for the Secret Society of Super Villains, a group of which Sinestro previously was a member. Here, he plays a major role in the Society's massacre of the Freedom Fighters, who are investigating the meeting place of other villains, but walk into an ambush. Sinestro begins the fight by blowing a hole through the chest of the second Black Condor, killing him instantly. He then defeats Uncle Sam, leaving him for dead.

Sinestro Corps

After the Battle of Metropolis, Sinestro retreats to the antimatter universe. He makes a pact with the Anti-Monitor and embraces the doctrine of spreading fear. The Green Lantern Corps is once again reformed with the return of Hal Jordan so Sinestro decides to found the Sinestro Corps, offering yellow power rings to the most feared and savage warriors of the universe. He is also revealed to have masterminded the death of Kyle Rayner's mother by having the sentient virus Despotellis invade her as part of a plot to break Kyle's will so that he can become Parallax's latest host.

The Sinestro Corps War begins with an attack on Oa. Sinestro himself returns to Korugar to confront his successor, Soranik Natu. Sinestro defeats her, but makes it appear she has defeated him. This will force her to stay on Korugar to fulfill her responsibilities as "the Savior of Korugar".

Sinestro returns to Qward and joins the battle occurring there. He confronts Earth's Green Lanterns, and upon their escape, follows them toward Earth, the Sinestro Corps' real target. The Sinestro Corps begin attacking Earth. Sinestro reveals to Hal, Guy and John that he intends to turn Earth into the new homeworld for the Sinestro Corps and the site of the new Coast City into a mass graveyard, "A mecca of fear". During the battle, the Guardians enacted new laws to the Book of Oa. The first new law was to give the Green Lanterns the ability to use lethal force. Sinestro claims he has achieved his overall goal because now the Green Lanterns spread fear by being unchecked. Hal Jordan and Kyle Rayner beat Sinestro in hand-to-hand combat. Sinestro is then imprisoned in Oa's Sciencells where he learns from Hal Jordan that he has received a death penalty. Despite his personal defeat, Sinestro claims victory. Sinestro's overall goal through his war was to groom his former Corps for a more active, forceful role in the universe. With the enactment of the Corps' new laws and the approval of lethal force, the Green Lantern corps will inspire fear, creating the same effect as the Sinestro Corps: order through fear.

With the hunt for the members of the Sinestro Corps becoming one of the Green Lantern Corps' highest priorities, many of those who wield yellow power rings have been incarcerated in Oa's Sciencells, with their power rings stored in the large chamber that houses the entire detention facility. Sinestro has been shown to have chewed a very large hole in his finger, and he used his blood to paint the insignia of the Sinestro Corps on his cell window. All Sinestro Corps members followed his example, with the result of thousands of emblems across the cosmic jail. When Sinestro formed his insignia from blood, the power rings stationed on Oa seemed to react violently, threatening to break free of their confines.

Rage of the Red Lanterns
Sinestro is to be executed on his homeworld of Korugar. During the transport, a group of Sinestro Corps members attempt to free him. Atrocitus and his Red Lanterns intervene by attacking both Corps and kidnapping Sinestro. In the midst of the battle, a Blue Lantern named Saint Walker tells Hal Jordan that Sinestro's survival is crucial to stop the Blackest Night. After being taken to Ysmault, he is nailed to a cross to await his execution at the hands of Atrocitus, who wishes to make Sinestro suffer greatly by taking his revenge on everything he has ever cared about. His targets include Korugar and Sinestro's hidden daughter. Sinestro breaks free and goes back to his home world to see to family business.

War of Light
After escaping the assault by the Red Lanterns, Sinestro finally reaches his homeworld of Korugar. After rapidly incapacitating Princess Iolande, he confronts Soranik Natu and reveals that she is his daughter. He informs Soranik that his wife took her as a child and left him as he began his rise to power on Korugar. He was eventually able to locate his daughter and give her the mark on her face, his family's coat of arms, along with a micro-transmitter so he could locate her. He visited Soranik throughout her life using his ring to alter his appearance. He even took a picture of her and the Natus at her medical school graduation. Sinestro then says that he is proud of his daughter for succeeding where he could not, namely bringing order to Korugar as a member of the Green Lantern Corps. He then tells her that they must work together to stop the Blackest Night. After leaving Korugar, Sinestro travels to visit the grave of Abin Sur and makes plans to lead an assault on the homeworld of the Star Sapphires.

Blackest Night

When he arrives, he first encounters Carol Ferris. While Sinestro holds no ill will towards Carol and only wishes to free his Corpswomen from Zamaron, he warns Carol that he will hurt her if she stands in his way. Carol then encases Sinestro in a crystal structure, forcing him to relive the death of his love, Arin Sur (Abin Sur's sister). Angered by this, Sinestro bursts free, staggering Carol enough for his Corpsmen to seize her. However, before he can capitalize on the advantage, the Black Lanterns invade, led by Amon Sur, shocking both Sinestro and Carol. Hal Jordan and Indigo-1 then appear, initially fighting off some of the Black Lanterns. Indigo-1 teleports the group to Korugar so that Sinestro may finally confront Mongul. Sinestro defeats Mongul by overriding his rings, then imprisons him within the Yellow Central Battery. Sinestro vows to keep Mongul alive (and torture him), then kill him when the Blackest Night is over. He also proclaims himself to be "leading this coalition" against the Black Lanterns. The Sinestro Corps' celebration is cut short when a ship crash lands nearby, containing Black Lanterns Abin and Arin Sur.

As the Black Lanterns attack, Sinestro is emotionally manipulated by the corpse of Arin. At one point, the corpse even alters itself to look more like a living person and addresses Sinestro by his full name (revealing his first name, Thaal, for the very first time). Just then Hal, Abin and Carol burst through the streets to where the others are. With all four in place, they destroy Abin's and Arin's rings. Afterward, Hal and Sinestro debate whether to contact the Blue or Red Lanterns, respectively. Hal then makes the decision himself. Sinestro relents, tells his Corps that there is a temporary truce with the GLC, and travels with the others to Odym. After gathering the other Corps leaders, Sinestro and the others follow the Black Lantern battery to Earth, where Nekron has already risen. Under Indigo-1's direction, they combine their lights, thinking it will destroy the Black Lanterns' source of power, but this fails and in an attempt to bolster their ranks, Ganthet duplicates the Corps leaders' rings, having them seek out candidates to deputize. Sinestro's ring chooses the Scarecrow. The Black Lantern Spectre then attacks the group. To defeat it, Hal releases Parallax from its prison, intending to let it possess him again. Sinestro offers to join with Parallax instead, but is rebuffed. When the restored Spectre manages to separate Parallax from Hal, Sinestro again tries to claim the fear entity as his own, but is foiled when Parallax is pulled away by an unknown force.

In the midst of the battle, Nekron kills a Guardian and uses its blood to summon a large white figure from Earth. Ganthet reveals this is the Entity, the living embodiment of the life force of the universe. It seems Earth is where life first began, a fact the Guardians did their best to hide so as to keep the Entity safe. Outraged at how the Guardians' need for control caused the death of Abin Sur, Sinestro stabs Ganthet with his ring. Hal Jordan realizes the Entity needs a mind to guide it and prepares to fly in, but Sinestro cuts him off. He dives into the white energy and emerges as a figure all in white, declaring he is about to show the universe he truly is the "greatest Lantern of them all". Entity intones "Thaal Sinestro of Korugar...Destiny awaits".

Later, Sinestro is apparently killed by Nekron, but healed back to life by the White Entity, claiming to be in harmony with every living being in the universe and thus reborn as the true Guardian of the Universe. However, Sinestro proves unable to fully control the Entity's power because of his ego-maniacal personality, and Nekron is able to separate them. Hal then comes to the realization that, even though Nekron allowed the various resurrections of the heroes he transformed into Black Lanterns, it was they who chose to live again. This enables Hal to access the Entity's power and transform himself and the other heroes into White Lanterns, resurrecting Black Hand and breaking Nekron's tether to the living universe. As the various corps part ways, Sinestro notes that Larfleeze himself has changed, as he actually returns Lex Luthor to the other gathered Corps rather than keeping Luthor for himself after he was forced to briefly share his power with the bald billionaire.

War of the Green Lanterns
In the Brightest Day crossover, Sinestro discovers a white power battery in a crater on Earth. In the first issue of the "New Guardians" story arc, Sinestro reveals that the white power battery wants Hal Jordan. He and the other Corps leaders must pursue Krona, who is trying to capture all of the emotional entities. Sinestro must also work with Kyle Rayner and the Green Lantern Corps in an effort to rescue Soranik Natu from a Qwardian who made Sinestro's original yellow ring.

In the War of the Green Lanterns storyline Sinestro and the other 'New Guardians' are trapped in the Book of the Black by Lyssa Drak while trying to recover the emotional entities from Krona. Hal Jordan alone is able to avoid the book and escapes with the other "New Guardians's" rings. He later uses Sinestro's ring when Parallax is returned to the Central Power Battery, allowing Krona to control all Green Lanterns. Hal and others escaped only thanks to their prior experience with Parallax granting them an immunity to the initial assault, to give himself a weapon against the other Lanterns. While attempting to escape the Book which forces the New Guardians to re-live their lives prior to acquiring their current rings, Sinestro discovers Indigo-1 in a prison cell, angrily proclaiming that she will escape whatever Abin Sur has planned for her, although he chooses to focus on his own escape rather than remain to question her more about this, only for Krona to burn the page that Sinestro is on before he can escape. Sinestro and the others are later freed by Kyle Rayner, who 'draws' their escape. Sinestro's ring attempts to return to him, but is overridden by Krona, who wields all seven varieties of power rings. As Hal Jordan battles Krona, Sinestro hears him as he declares his dedication to the cause of the Green Lanterns and is inspired to join his old enemy in battle. As he fights Krona, a green power ring comes to him, making Sinestro a Green Lantern once more. Sinestro is not interested in becoming a Green Lantern, but the Guardians of the Universe convince him to join the Corps. Later, when the Green Lantern Corps are in disagreement and attempt to kill him, the Corps break into the sciencells, but they discover that Sinestro was in captivity by the Guardians, who are trying to remove Sinestro's green ring, but the ring will not be removed. Later, the Green Lantern Corps were in a meeting with the Guardians and told that they should choose between discipline, continuing the fight, and starting a mutiny. The other Green Lantern Corps are in agreement.

The New 52
In September 2011, The New 52 rebooted DC's continuity. In this new timeline, Sinestro is angry that he has a Green Lantern power ring. The Guardians of the Universe state that the ring wishes to redeem him. With the aid of Hal Jordan, Sinestro returns to his home world of Korugar and liberates his people from the out-of-control Sinestro Corps, although his people are still afraid. Disabling his former group by rendering them comatose, he heads back out into space with the intent of shutting down the entire Sinestro Corps.

Later, he witnesses the prophecy of the Guardians' plans for a "Third Army" and once again retrieves Hal from Earth. However, he is captured by the Indigo Tribe and is forcibly bound to an Indigo ring. Hal convinces the Tribe that he can help Sinestro atone for his past deeds without being bound to an Indigo Ring.

The two then retrieve the Book of the Black to glean information about the future, but it inadvertently takes them to the evil Black Hand. Elsewhere, the Guardians discuss how they willed Hal's ring to claim Sinestro to undermine all the other Corps, especially his own. Black Hand engages Sinestro and Hal in combat, whereupon the Guardians arrive and command Black Hand to kill both Green Lanterns. As their life is drained away, Hal and Sinestro fuse their rings together and send off the resulting ring to get help. Soon after, Hal and Sinestro are banished to the Dead Zone.

They wander the Dead Zone searching for a way to escape and encounter the deceased Tomar-Re. He asks Sinestro and Hal to stop Volthoom, the First Lantern. When Simon Baz enters the Dead Zone during a fight with Black Hand, a way out is provided by Green Lantern B'dg. Sinestro reclaims the green ring and exits the Dead Zone with Simon.

Sinestro then teleports to his home planet of Korugar to rally support against the First Lantern. Volthoom attacks and consumes the hopes and fears of the Korugarians. With his newfound power levels, Volthoom destroys the entire planet, leaving Sinestro in the rubble.

When Kyle Rayner and Carol Ferris arrive at Korugar's remains, Sinestro attacks, but immediately notices that Kyle is now a White Lantern. Sinestro demands that Kyle resurrects Korugar, but Kyle is unable to do so. Sinestro takes the white ring to become a White Lantern himself, but it rejects him as an unsuitable host, much to his horror. He then claims the yellow power battery instead and leaves to exact revenge, as he became a member of the Sinestro Corps again while Simon Baz fails to resurrect Korugar as well after he was rejected as an unsuitable host while wielding the white ring.

He arrives on the planet Oa and strikes Volthoom, but their battle is interrupted by the Indigo Tribe. The Tribe opens a portal to the Dead Zone, allowing Hal to escape as a Black Lantern. Volthoom engages Hal and reality begins to unravel. Sinestro turns to the Yellow Central Power Battery and releases Parallax, becoming its new host to attack Volthoom with heightened power levels. Volthoom is ultimately defeated when Hal Jordan summons Nekron.

Afterwards, Sinestro reactivates his Sinestro Corps and heads off to kill the Guardians for all the harm that they have caused. Hal attempts to talk Sinestro out of this course of action to save him from himself. However, it was too late as Sinestro reveals that he had already killed the Guardians before Hal intercepted him. Sinestro vanishes and leaves Arkillo in charge of the Sinestro Corps. Reappearing elsewhere, Sinestro secretly brings Ganthet and Sayd together, stating that he knows what it is like to lose everything, but exiles them both from Oa.

During the Forever Evil storyline after Batman uses a yellow ring, Sinestro appears to confront Power Ring. Sinestro follows Power Ring through the sewers, eventually severing his right arm and allowing his ring to go search for a new host. Relieved to be free, Power Ring dies, thanking Sinestro. After that, Sinestro joins Batman, Catwoman and the rest of Lex Luthor's team into taking down the Crime Syndicate. When it comes to the final battle against the Crime Syndicate, Sinestro and Black Adam move the moon where the sun ends up weakening Ultraman. In the aftermath of the battle against the Crime Syndicate, it was stated that the villains who helped to stop the Crime Syndicate would have their criminal records wiped. Sinestro and Black Adam did not care about that; they begin laughing since they know the rules do not apply to them and went their separate ways, along with the other villains.

Sinestro then travels to a monastery on a planet. In it, he finds runes that could help him 'purge' the entity from his system. After doing so, he simply meditates there, awaiting death. Then Lyssa Drak appears before him and tries to convince him to come back. He refuses, even when she says Arkillo is making a mockery of the Corps, creating thousands of rings for anyone who will swear loyalty to him. Then she reveals his people are still alive. When he asks how she knows this, she reveals she has carved every word from the Book of Parallax on her body. When Sinestro realizes that the remaining Korugarians are suffering because of his inaction, he feels fear again and his ring reactivates.

After rescuing a group of pods containing some Korugarians from the servants of the Pale Vicars, Sinestro and Lyssa Drak head to the refuge of the Sinestro Corps. Arkillo currently leads the Yellow Lanterns as the Arkillo Corps and has Soranik Natu as his captive. He and his Lanterns attack Sinestro who manages to defeat them. He forces Arkillo to yield and kills a Yellow Lantern who tries to attack him from behind as he said that Sinestro must die, melting his ring to stop it from finding a replacement. With his leadership retained, Sinestro sends Arkillo to the infirmary and Soranik argues with him, believing he had her captured. Refuting this, Sinestro shows her the Korugarians he saved and asks her to help them. Sinestro creates an elite team to personally serve him, consisting of Romat-Ru, Lyssa Drak, Rigen Kale, Dez Trivius and the most vocal Sinestro Corpsmen and has them aid himself in taking Necroplis as the new planet for the Korugarians and the moon for the Sinestro Corps. Returning to his base of operations to prepare for the move to Necropolis, Sinestro and Soranik meet with the recently awakened Korugarians who voice their distrust of Sinestro despite his intentions. Sinestro brings a Green Lantern Power Battery for Soranik to recharge and she joins his team in rescuing a group of Korugarians that are being sold into slavery on the planet Muz.

After rescuing them, they are attacked by the Paling. The Sinestro Corps defeats them and Sinestro executes them all. On their way back, Soranik reveals she left the rescued Korugarians with Hal Jordan, which angers Sinestro, who then attacks him. Sinestro's elite team joins the fight but Sinestro calls them off say that he and Hal can have a 'civilized' discussion at a safe location for the Korugarians. Hal berates Sinestro for allowing Parallax to control him and kill the Guardians, which Sinestro refuses. He proves to Hal that he is in control and summons Parallax to attack Hal, then calls it back, proving that he has mastered fear itself. Leaving Hal behind, Sinestro leaves with his team and the Korugarians, with Soranik leaving with him to look after her people.

In the aftermath of the war with the New Gods of New Genesis, Sinestro turns Warworld into the new base and headquarters of the Sinestro Corps, after the Green Lantern Corps are apparently dissolved.

DC Rebirth
Subsequently, in DC Rebirth, Warworld transports to the ruins of the planet Oa, while Sinestro (with seemingly old age) plans to control the universe. When Sinestro senses the spectrum of green light, he enters the core with Parallax. He possesses the fear entity of Parallax again and returns to his youth. He sends out his enforcers of his Corps to control the new order of the universe with fear.

When Sinestro is stunned that his Corps have reports that Hal Jordan has returned and attacks the Corps, his daughter, Soranik Natu rebels against her father, saying that he should take responsibility for his failures and that he will never learn from the Green Lantern Corps. Later, Sinestro alliances with the priests of the Sacrament, who are an enemy of the Green Lantern Corps, who reconsider him to aiding enforcement controls of the Vega system. His Corps has captured Green Lantern Guy Gardner, instead of Hal. Sinestro is furious and demands to know where Hal is, but he learns that Soranik has secured Hal safely. Sinestro then uses the imprisoned people in Warworld's engine to increase the power of fear for his Corps, while he tries to interrogate Guy to where the Green Lantern Corps are.

Later, Sinestro feels he is in jeopardy now that the Green Lantern Corps have returned, including the fact that his daughter, Soranik, has rejected his Corps. He increases his Parallax powers to one thousand percent when Hal returns and invades Warworld. Sinestro orders his Corps to stop intervening in his personal fight against Hal and confronts his former pupil face to face. During the battle, Sinestro discovers too late that his powers have decreased due to Soranik rescuing the people that were used to power the Fear Engine. Hal then uses his energies as a living construct to incinerate the Fear Warlord and destroys Warworld, apparently sacrificing himself and killing Sinestro in the process.

Later, it is revealed that Sinestro survived from the attack, is critically injured and that he and Lyssa Drak were teleported to Qward.

The Green Lantern and Sinestro Corps now under Soranik Natu form an alliance against the encroaching Dark Multiverse. Sinestro initially plans to cooperate but is met at the Source Wall by Lex Luthor, who invites Sinestro to Earth to join his Legion of Doom. Attracted by the promise of the "Invisible Emotional Spectrum", a source of power Sinestro became aware of in his youth just before joining the Green Lanterns, Sinestro abandons the Corps and travels to Earth. Reverting to his original Silver Age costume, and wielding the power of the Ultraviolet Corps rather than his Qwardian power ring, he successfully brainwashes half the planet and begins to bring the black sun Umbrax, source of the Invisible Spectrum, into the universe. After the plan is foiled, he remains an ally of Luthor.

Powers and abilities

Sinestro wields a yellow power ring that is functionally similar to those of the Green Lanterns, granting him flight, the ability to survive in any environment and the ability to create constructs of any shape and size. The ring must be regularly recharged with the aid of a power battery shaped like a lantern. Unlike Hal Jordan and most Green Lanterns, Sinestro wears his ring on his left hand.

As a host whose body reined in and mastered the Emotional Embodiment of Fear, Sinestro now acts as the host as well as containment vessel for the emotional entity of his Corps; Parallax gives him unprecedented power both physical and metaphysical in nature. Like previous hosts before him, Sinestro has vast reality-altering abilities, as well as a greatly amplified ring. Physically, the Master of Fear gains a dynamism boost as well, putting him on par with some of DC's strongest characters such as Superman or most notably Black Adam, shown when both he and Adam moved Earth's moon out of the path of its sun together, or when he was under assault by equally powerful assailants such as Superwoman, Deathstorm and Alexander Luthor who had stolen multiple powers.

Sinestro is also highly proficient in hand-to-hand combat and battle strategies, owing to his training as a former Green Lantern. He proves to be a physical match for Hal Jordan owing to these skills.

Physical appearance
The visual design of Sinestro, according to artist Gil Kane was based upon British actor David Niven.

Other versions

52 Multiverse
In the final issue of DC Comics' 2006-07 year-long weekly series, 52 #52, it was revealed that a "Multiverse" system of 52 parallel universes, with each Earth being a different take on established DC Comics characters as featured in the mainstream continuity (designated as "New Earth") had come into existence. The Multiverse acts as a storytelling device that allows writers to introduce alternate versions of fictional characters, hypothesize "what if?" scenarios, re-visit popular Elseworlds stories and allow these characters to interact with the mainstream continuity.

The 2007-08 weekly series Countdown to Final Crisis (or simply Countdown) and its spin-offs would either directly show or insinuate the existence of alternate versions of Sinestro in the Multiverse. For example, Countdown #16 detailed that the Sinestro of Earth-51 has been murdered by the proactive Batman of his world in a crusade against its villains. Countdown spin-off series Countdown Presents: Lord Havok and the Extremists depicted a version of Sinestro in its third issue (2008) from an alternate world referred to as "Green Sinestro", depicted as a part of the villainous Monarch's army. This version has his original green power ring, but is no less vicious than his mainstream continuity counterpart and the official designation of his world is unrevealed.

Elseworlds
An alternate Sinestro appears in Batman: In Darkest Knight, fulfilling both his own role and that of the Joker, becoming unhinged after absorbing the mind of Joe Chill, as well as creating that world's Two-Face/Evil Star and Star Sapphire/Catwoman.

Generations
In Superman & Batman: Generations - an AU where all heroes are shown aging in real-time, Sinestro attacks Earth to try and eliminate Hal Jordan - who here went into politics rather than heroism, rising to the position of President in the 1980s, but is defeated when Jordan dons Alan Scott's ring, having realised that the rings actually have no vulnerabilities except what the user believes they possess.

Ame-Comi Girls
The Ame-Comi Girls universe version of Sinestro is a girl named Sinestra.

Flashpoint
In the alternate timeline of the Flashpoint event, Sinestro is still a Green Lantern, and his mentor Abin Sur is still alive. The duo's friendship has become strained due to the death of Abin's sister Arin. After Abin is sent to Earth by the Guardians, Sinestro approaches the imprisoned Red Lantern Atrocitus on Ysmault, seeking information about the prophecy related with the "Flashpoint". Having learned that the "Flashpoint" is a moment when all of history will be changed, Sinestro travels to Earth to confront Abin Sur, determined to find the "Flash" who changed history and use his power to reset the universe to what he believes it should be. During the struggle, Abin Sur destroys his ring and imprisons him. Abin Sur then contacts the Guardians of the Universe to expel Sinestro from the Corps.

Book of Oa
In the distant future, a Green Lantern named Toris serves as the bookkeeper on Oa. A rookie Green Lantern named Snow wishes to hear the tales of the greatest Green Lanterns in history. Toris opens the book of Oa and proceeds to tell him the legend of Hal Jordan. After his storytelling is done, Lantern Snow asks about the other Green Lanterns of Earth and their lives after, and Toris elaborates even further on their eventual destiny. When Lantern Snow asks about the fate of Sinestro, Toris claims that they will never know what happened to him since he burned the book's pages of Sinestro long ago, saying it was for the best. It is heavily implied that Toris is none other than Sinestro himself.

Futures End
In the possible future of Futures End set five years, the Sinestro Corps are attacked on New Korugar by the Apex League. With the Corps being decimated by the league, Soranik (who has joined the Sinestro Corps) pleads with her father to release Parallax. Sinestro refuses as its release would destroy the planet. He decides to lead the league away, along with Lyssa Drak, to save the planet. This succeeds, but the Apex League captures Sinestro and imprisons him within the Tartaros Ultra-Max Penitentiary. Sinestro devises a way to escape and is aided by the former keeper of the Indigo Light, Natromo. Lyssa Drak appears before Sinestro, revealing she has found the weapon he desires. Natromo presents a trinket (created from parts Sinestro scavenged for him) to Sinestro, allowing him to use the light of fear again and stages a prison break with a group of inmates. Sinestro meets with the ghost of Lyssa Drak who fulfills her final obligation and disappears, leaving behind her skull which Sinestro takes. After landing on New Korugar, Sinestro kills the other inmates and observes the corpse filled, wasteland of his former planet. The Apex League confronts him, revealing that an angry and hungry Parallax freed itself from the planet's core, stripped the Sinestro Corps of their powers and devoured them. Sinestro blames the Apex League for this and smashes Lyssa Drak's skull on the ground. A Black Lantern Power Ring emerges from the skull's remains and transforms Sinestro into a Black Lantern. He then reanimates the Sinestro Corps as Black Lanterns and they attack the Apex League.

JLA/Avengers
In JLA/Avengers Sinestro is among the mind-controlled villains who attack the heroes as they assault Krona's stronghold. He is defeated by Photon.

Earth One
In Green Lantern: Earth One, Sinestro is among those who respond to Hal Jordan's distress call and participates in the recovery of the Central Power Battery from the Manhunters.

Dark Multiverse
In Dark Multiverse: Blackest Night, Sinestro's ego refused to relinquish his control of the Life Entity even after he was 'killed' by the Black Lanterns, resulting in him existing in a twisted state of half-life where his left side is 'dead' and wearing a Black Lantern ring. This gives him the ability to temporarily restore the original identities of his Black Lantern foes, but this measure is temporary and only serves to give him time to get away. Eventually making contact with Lobo, Dove, and Mister Miracle, the last other living beings in this universe, Sinestro learns that it may be possible to stop the Black Lanterns by channelling the power of the Source Wall through Dove, but when Mister Miracle realises that this will remake the universe rather than undoing the Black Lanterns' assault, he kills Dove before being killed by Lobo. With no other options, Sinestro channels the Source's power through Lobo, but this creates a twisted form of life that seeks to destroy all traces of what came before while warring with itself. Sinestro is last shown trying to find a way to escape his twisted reality, but he is kept contained by higher powers who will not risk his infection spreading to other worlds in the multiverse.

DCeased
In DCeased: War of the Undead Gods, Sinestro and the Yellow Lanterns are in control of Warworld. When Darkseid, Supergirl and an army of New Gods all infected with the Anti-Life virus attack Korugar, Sinestro and the Corps arrive to protect his homeworld. They are stopped by Suranik and Kyle Rayner, who believe they are trying to attack the planet. Unliving Darkseid then arrives and decapitates Sinestro, who urges his daughter and Rayner to escape.

In other media

Television
 Sinestro appears in Challenge of the Super Friends, voiced by Vic Perrin. This version is a member of the Legion of Doom who can freely travel to and from the antimatter universe.
 Sinestro appears in the Super Friends episode "The Revenge of Doom", voiced by Jeff Winkless. This version is a member of the Legion of Doom.
 Sinestro appears in Legends of the Superheroes, portrayed by Charlie Callas. This version is a member of the Legion of Doom.
 Sinestro appears in series set in the DC Animated Universe (DCAU), voiced by Ted Levine:
 First appearing in the Superman: The Animated Series episode "In Brightest Day...", this version personally killed Abin Sur and goes on to battle Superman and the newly empowered Kyle Rayner.
 As of the Justice League two-part episode "Secret Society", Sinestro has developed a grudge against John Stewart and joined Gorilla Grodd's Secret Society.
 Sinestro appears in the Static Shock episode "Fallen Hero", in which he steals Stewart's power battery and masquerades as him until the latter joins forces with Static to defeat him.
 Sinestro appears in Justice League Unlimited as a member of an expanded Secret Society. Prior to and during the episodes "Alive!" and "Destroyer", Lex Luthor usurps Grodd as the Society's leader, but the latter mounts a mutiny to take back his position. In the ensuing battle between those loyal to Luthor and those with Grodd, Sinestro sides with the former. After Darkseid attacks and kills most the Society, Luthor, Sinestro, and the survivors join forces with the Justice League to repel Darkseid's invasion of Earth.
 Sinestro appears in the Duck Dodgers episode "The Green Loontern", voiced by John de Lancie.
 Sinestro appears in The Batman episode "Ring Toss", voiced by Miguel Ferrer. This version sports a bulbous head and a Horseshoe moustache.
 Sinestro as a Green Lantern appears in the Batman: The Brave and the Bold episode "The Eyes of Despero!", voiced by Xander Berkeley. Additionally, a heroic, alternate universe incarnation of Sinestro as a Yellow Lantern appears in the episode "Deep Cover For Batman!".
 Sinestro appears in the Green Lantern: The Animated Series episode "Prisoner of Sinestro", voiced by Ron Perlman. This version is initially revered by Hal Jordan as a legendary Green Lantern and secretly violates the Green Lantern Corps' rules whenever possible. In an interview with producer Giancarlo Volpe, he revealed Sinestro would have appeared in a season two episode wherein he framed Jordan for his crimes before the series was cancelled.
 Sinestro appears in the Robot Chicken DC Comics Special and Robot Chicken DC Comics Special 2: Villains in Paradise, voiced by Zeb Wells. This version is a member of the Legion of Doom.
 Sinestro appears in the Justice League Action episode "The Ringer", voiced by Darin De Paul. This version's power ring is guarded by Despotellis, who provides Sinestro a significant power boost.
 Sinestro appears in the DC Super Hero Girls (2019) episode "#ItsComplicated", voiced by Keith Ferguson. He disguises himself as a high school student called Thaal Sinclair and pretends to date Carol Ferris to make Hal Jordan jealous.
 Sinestro makes non-speaking cameo appearances in Harley Quinn as a member of the Legion of Doom.

Film
 Sinestro appears in Green Lantern: First Flight, voiced by Victor Garber. This version is a respected member of the Green Lantern Corps who believes they and the Guardians of the Universe are not proactive enough in maintaining order in the universe. Seeking to overthrow Oa and instill his brand of order through fear, he collaborates with Corps member Boodikka and dictator Kanjar Ro to search for the yellow element and make the Weaponers of Qward fashion it into a weapon capable of destroying the Corps. Sinestro later kills Ro and frames the newly recruited Hal Jordan for it before seeking the weapon, a yellow power ring and battery. He successfully defeats the Guardians and Corps, but Jordan absorbs the Guardians' green element and destroys Sinestro's battery, weakening him before Kilowog crushes the latter's ring and hand.
 Sinestro appears in Green Lantern: Emerald Knights, voiced by Jason Isaacs. This version previously worked with his friend, Abin Sur, though Atrocitus foresaw Sinestro's eventual betrayal and formation of the Sinestro Corps.
 Sinestro appears in Green Lantern, portrayed by Mark Strong. This version is a dedicated and respected member of the Green Lantern Corps. He attempts to convince the Guardians of the Universe to defeat Parallax by creating a yellow power ring from the entity's fear energy, but new recruit Hal Jordan convinces the Guardians otherwise. Following Parallax's defeat, Sinestro steals the yellow ring and replaces his green ring with it.
 Sinestro appears in Lego DC Comics Super Heroes: Justice League: Attack of the Legion of Doom, voiced by Mark Hamill. He, Lex Luthor, and Black Manta seek to form the Legion of Doom.
 Sinestro makes a non-speaking cameo appearance in Teen Titans Go! To the Movies.
 Sinestro appears in Green Lantern: Beware My Power, voiced by Rick D. Wasserman. This version orchestrated the Rann–Thanagar War and Hal Jordan's transformation into Parallax.

Video games
 Sinestro makes a cameo appearance in Hal Jordan's ending in Mortal Kombat vs. DC Universe.
 Sinestro as a Yellow Lantern appears in Batman: The Brave and the Bold – The Videogame, voiced again by Xander Berkeley. He joins forces with Guy Gardner and Batman to save his home planet from Starro.
 Sinestro appears in DC Universe Online, voiced by Robert Kraft. This version is a rival of John Stewart.
 Sinestro appears as a playable co-op character in the PlayStation 3 and Xbox 360 versions of Green Lantern: Rise of the Manhunters, voiced by Marton Csokas.
 Sinestro appears as a playable character in Injustice: Gods Among Us, voiced again by Troy Baker. Additionally, an alternate universe incarnation of Sinestro appears as a high-ranking member of High Councilor Superman's Regime who converted Hal Jordan into a Yellow Lantern. In his non-canonical arcade mode ending, Sinestro defeats Superman, but becomes concerned that fear might not be enough to conquer the universe. He leads the Sinestro Corps into battle against the Life Entity for the White Lantern Corps' power battery. Proving victorious, he becomes a White Lantern and sets out to destroy the Green Lantern Corps.
 Sinestro appears as a playable character in Infinite Crisis, voiced again by Marc Worden.
 Sinestro appears as a playable character in DC Unchained.

Lego
 Sinestro appears as a boss and unlockable character in Lego Batman 2: DC Super Heroes, voiced by Troy Baker.
 Sinestro appears as a playable character in Lego Batman 3: Beyond Gotham, voiced by Marc Worden.
 Sinestro appears in Lego DC Super-Villains, voiced again by Marc Worden. This version is a member of the Legion of Doom.

Miscellaneous
 The Injustice incarnation of Sinestro appears in the Injustice: Gods Among Us prequel comic. This version was a dictator who drove his wife Arin Sur to suicide and became estranged from his daughter Soranik. Subsequently, he was depowered and expelled by Hal Jordan and the Green Lantern Corps, which he saw as a betrayal. In the present, Sinestro leads the Sinestro Corps in intercepting and killing Kyle Rayner before he can reach the Justice League's Watchtower. While Superman nearly beats Sinestro to death, the latter reveals he came to join the former, recognizing Superman's personality shift. Sinestro is temporarily held prisoner in the Hall of Justice until he explains his history to Superman, who comes to view him as a kindred spirit and frees him. While being forced to work together to find a device capable of destroying planets, Sinestro and Jordan work out their tense relationship. To further Superman's growing Regime, Sinestro stages an attack on Earth by Despero before killing him and staging it as him acting in self-defense, kills John Stewart, and manipulates Jordan into believing Guy Gardner did so. After Jordan inadvertently kills Gardner, he is expelled from the Green Lantern Corps and is convinced by Sinestro to become a Yellow Lantern.
 Sinestro appears in the DC Super Hero Girls (2015) four-part episode "Ring Me Maybe", voiced by Tom Kenny.
 The Injustice incarnation of Sinestro appears in the Injustice 2 prequel comic. Following Superman's Regime being dismantled, Sinestro and Hal Jordan stand trial on Oa for their role in aiding and abetting Superman, during which they are sentenced to imprisonment on the planet Harring. After Jordan beats Sinestro for manipulating him, the latter is placed in solitary confinement and is later visited by Soranik, who questions him over her mother Arin's demise. He attempts to steal Soranik's power ring, but the Red Lantern Corps arrive to take Sinestro. He tries to take one of their power rings, but Jordan puts it on. The arriving Green Lantern Corps retreat, taking Sinestro back to Oa to question him about Atrocitus' identity. Amidst Starro and the Red Lantern Corps' attack on Oa, Jordan convinces the Guardians of the Universe to give Sinestro a power ring so he can help repel the attack and save Soranik. Refusing to harm her despite her being possessed by a Starro spore, Sinestro is impaled by her, but successfully removes her spore and apologizes to her before he dies. Afterward, Soranik succeeds him as a Green Lantern.

References

External links
 The Book of OA
 Sinestro at ComicBookDB.com.

Comics characters introduced in 1961
DC Comics aliens
DC Comics extraterrestrial superheroes
DC Comics film characters
DC Comics superheroes
DC Comics extraterrestrial supervillains
DC Comics male supervillains
Fictional avatars
Fictional characters with elemental transmutation abilities
Fictional characters who can manipulate light
Fictional characters with energy-manipulation abilities
Fictional characters who can manipulate reality
Fictional characters who can manipulate time
Fictional dictators
Fictional mass murderers
Fictional warlords
Fighting game characters
Characters created by Gil Kane
Characters created by John Broome
Supervillains with their own comic book titles
Green Lantern Corps officers
Film supervillains
Villains in animated television series